The Canal Museum is a museum in Anping District, Tainan, Taiwan.

History
The museum building was originally constructed in 1926 as the Anping Customs building. It was the place where docked ships paid tariffs when arriving or leaving Anping. It was declared a historical building and converted into the Canal Museum in 2003.

Architecture
The museum building is a Japanese-style building with two banyan trees in front yard and decorated with black brick roof and red brick wall.

See also
 List of museums in Taiwan

References

2003 establishments in Taiwan
Buildings and structures completed in 1926
Museums established in 2003
Museums in Tainan